Catoptria combinella is a species of moth of the family Crambidae. It is found in Europe.

References

Crambini
Moths of Europe